Datuk Ong Kim Swee DPSM is a Malaysian football manager and former footballer, who is the Head coach of Malaysia Super League club Sabah. He spent most of his career playing for East Malaysian teams, notably Sarawak and Sabah during the mid 1990s. Ong currently serves as the Football Association of Malaysia (FAM)'s Technical Director effective 1 January 2021.

Career

Playing career 
Ong began his career as a player for Malacca in the early 1990s. He was a member of the Malaysia Olympic teams nicknamed Barcelona 1992 under Chow Kwai Lam. In 1993, Ong joined Sarawak FA for whom he played two seasons before being controversially transferred to Sabah FA in late 1994. With Sabah, he won the Malaysia FA Cup in 1995 and M-League in 1996. He retired in 1998 because of an injury while playing for Malacca.

Ong made his full international debut against Kuwait on 22 September 1994. He was a member of the Malaysian squad for the 1994 Asian Games and also played for a Malaysian Selection side who famously held Flamengo to a 1–1 draw in an exhibition match in 1995.

Managerial career 
Ong coached Malacca FA in 2005. In 2009, Ong took over as head coach of Harimau Muda from K. Rajagopal. He won the 2009 Malaysia Premier League with Harimau Muda that year. He was the manager of the Malaysia national under-23 football team which competed in the 2012 Olympic Qualifiers and 2011 Southeast Asian Games.

Ong also coached the club side of Malaysia U-23 squad, Harimau Muda A, who competed in Australia's National Premier Leagues Queensland in 2014. In 2015, Ong was appointed as head coach of Malaysia national football team after the resignation of the previous coach Dollah Salleh. Ong previously had hold the post on an interim basis in 2014 before Dollah was appointed. Despite a series of disappointing results in the World Cup qualification, Ong was handed a new two-year contract on 18 January 2016 in charge of the national team.

Ong was re-designated as Malaysia U-22 head coach, replacing Frank Bernhardt, in March 2017 following the appointment of new FAM president Tunku Ismail Idris. With the Malaysia U-22 team, Ong succeeded in reaching the final of the 2017 Southeast Asian Games football tournament on home soil, winning silver as the losing finalist to Thailand as well qualifying the team to the quarter-finals of 2018 AFC U-23 Championship.
The Football Association of Malaysia (FAM) announced the resignation of Datuk Ong Kim Swee after its technical director accepted the position as the new head coach of Sabah FA.

Honours

Managerial honours 
Harimau Muda
 Malaysia Premier League (1): 2009

Malaysia U23 / U22
 SEA Games Gold Medal (1): 2011
 SEA Games Silver Medal (1): 2017
 Merdeka Tournament (1): 2013
 International U-21 Thanh Niên Newspaper Cup (1) : 2012

Personal Honours 
Honour of Malaysia
  :
  Companion Class II of the Exalted Order of Malacca (DPSM) - Datuk (2013)

References

External links 
 Datuk Ong Kim Swee - Tag Archive - Sports247.My

1970 births
Living people
People from Malacca
Malaysian sportspeople of Chinese descent
Malaysian footballers
Malaysia international footballers
Malaysian football managers
Malaysia national football team managers
Sarawak FA players
Malacca FA players
Sabah F.C. (Malaysia) players
Footballers at the 1994 Asian Games
Association football midfielders
21st-century Malaysian people
Asian Games competitors for Malaysia